Makhdoom Ahmed Mehmood is a Pakistani businessman and politician who is the chairman of JDW Group. Belonging from Jamal Din Wali Tehsil Sadiqabad of District Rahim Yar Khan, in Punjab. He was elected to the National Assemblies on IJI ticket in 1990–1993, PMLN's ticket from 1993 to 1996 and 1996 to 1999. He was also elected to Punjab Assembly on PML-N ticket from 1988 to 1990, and on PML-F ticket from 2008 to 2012. He remained District Nazim Rahim Yar Khan from 2001 to 2005. In the end of 2012 he left PML-F and joined PPP on desire of then President Asif Ali Zardari who had declared him Governor-designate of Punjab.

Before joining the Peoples Party, he was part of the Muslim League-F, but joined the Peoples Party after settling for the governorship. He left PML-F and became Governor Punjab. Presently, he is the president of PPP South Punjab chapter.

Political Career 

On 25 December 2012, he took oath as 29th Governor of Punjab. He resigned from the post of the governor on 13 May 2013 after PML-N swept the elections but president rejected the resignation.

References

Pakistan People's Party politicians
1961 births
Allama Iqbal Open University alumni
Living people
Governors of Punjab, Pakistan
Politicians from Karachi
Punjab MPAs 1988–1990
Punjab MPAs 2008–2013